The Nurek Dam (Tajik: Нерӯгоҳи обии Норак, Nerūgohi obii Norak, Tajik for Nurek Hydro-electric Station) is an earth-fill embankment dam on the Vakhsh River in Tajikistan. Its primary purpose is hydroelectric power generation and its power station has an installed capacity of 3,015 MW. Construction of the dam began in 1961 and the power station's first generator was commissioned in 1972. The last generator was commissioned in 1979 and the entire project was completed in 1980 when Tajikistan was still a republic within the Soviet Union, becoming the tallest dam in the world at the time. At , it is currently the second tallest man-made dam in the world, after being surpassed by Jinping-I Dam in 2013. The Rogun Dam, also along the Vakhsh in Tajikistan, may exceed it in size when completed.

Construction

The Nurek Dam was constructed by the Soviet Union between the years 1961 and 1980. It is uniquely constructed, with a central core of cement forming an impermeable barrier within a -high rock and earth fill construction.  The volume of the mound is 54 million m3. The dam includes nine hydroelectric generating units, the first commissioned in 1972 and the last in 1979. An estimated 5,000 people were resettled from the dam's flooding area.

A town near the dam, also called Nurek, houses engineers and other workers employed at the dam's power plant.

Electricity generation
A total of nine Francis turbine-generators are installed in the Nurek Dam's power station. Originally having a generating capacity of 300 MW each (2,700 MW total), they were redesigned and retrofitted between 1984 and 1988 so now have a capacity of 335 MW each (3,015 MW total). As of 1994, this formed most of the nation's 4.0 gigawatt hydroelectric generating capacity, which was adequate to meet 98% of the nation's electricity needs.

Reservoir

The reservoir formed by the Nurek Dam, known simply as Nurek, is the largest reservoir in Tajikistan with a capacity of 10.5 km3. The reservoir drives the hydroelectric plant located within the dam. Stored water is also used for irrigation of agricultural land. It is suspected that the reservoir may have caused induced seismicity when being impounded.

References 

Hydroelectric power stations in Tajikistan
Lakes of Tajikistan
Hydroelectric power stations built in the Soviet Union
Dams completed in 1980
Dams on the Vakhsh River
Dams in Tajikistan
Khatlon Region
Energy infrastructure completed in 1979
Earth-filled dams
Districts of Republican Subordination